James McAndrews (October 22, 1862 – August 31, 1942) was a U.S. Representative from Illinois.

Born in Woonsocket, Rhode Island, McAndrews attended the common schools. He moved to Chicago, Illinois, and engaged in business, serving as building commissioner of Chicago.

McAndrews was elected as a Democrat to the Fifty-seventh and Fifty-eighth Congresses (March 4, 1901 – March 3, 1905). He was then elected to the Sixty-third and to the three succeeding Congresses (March 4, 1913 – March 3, 1921).
He was an unsuccessful candidate for reelection in 1920 to the Sixty-seventh Congress, and instead resumed his business activities.
He was also an unsuccessful candidate for election in 1932 to the Seventy-third Congress.

McAndrews was elected to the Seventy-fourth, Seventy-fifth, and Seventy-sixth Congresses (January 3, 1935 – January 3, 1941). He was an unsuccessful candidate for reelection in 1940 to the Seventy-seventh Congress. He died in Chicago, Illinois, and was interred in Calvary Cemetery, Evanston, Illinois.

References

1862 births
1942 deaths
People from Woonsocket, Rhode Island
Politicians from Chicago
Democratic Party members of the United States House of Representatives from Illinois
Burials at Calvary Cemetery (Evanston, Illinois)